Howell Binkley (July 25, 1956 –  August 14, 2020) was a professional lighting designer in New York City. He received the Tony Award for Best Lighting Design in a Musical for Jersey Boys in 2006, and again in 2016 for Hamilton. He died due to lung cancer on August 14, 2020.

Career
Binkley attended East Carolina University in Greenville, North Carolina where he began his career working with dance programs.

In 1985, he moved to New York City where he co-founded the Parsons Dance Company with David Parsons. Binkley then went on to make his Broadway debut as designer for Kiss of the Spider Woman  in 1993, which earned him his first ever Tony nomination. From this success he went on to design and light a plethora of major Broadway shows. In total, he designed 52 shows for Broadway and was nominated for a Tony Award nine times. Over the course of his work in Broadway, he became a frequent collaborator with Hal Prince and director Des McAnuff. 

In addition to his work in New York City, Binkley worked across America, including national tours of Applause in 1996; tick, tick…BOOM! in 2003; and Flashdance in 2012. Alongside this, he worked at regional theaters such as La Jolla Playhouse, Shakespeare Theatre DC, Old Globe Theatre, the Guthrie Theater, The Goodman Theatre, and Hartford Stage.

Binkley was well known for his use of saturated color, accompanied by white or slightly cool highlights. He frequently used smoke or haze to draw attention to his use of angle. His designs are partly based upon Craig Miller and Tom Skelton's use of cross focussing to make diamond effects.

Awards and nominations

References

External links

Internet Off-Broadway Database prfile
London Theatre Database profile
American Theatre Wing's Working in the Theatre Episode on Lighting Design

East Carolina University alumni
American lighting designers
Tony Award winners
2020 deaths
1956 births